A list of groups who are anti-vaccine, vaccine-critical or hesitant.

Global
White Rose (disinformation group)
World Chiropractic Alliance

Europe

Austria
People – Freedom – Fundamental Rights

Denmark
Freedom List

Finland
Crystal Party
Power Belongs to the People
Freedom Alliance (Finland)

France
National League for Liberty in Vaccination

Germany
 Grassroots Democratic Party of Germany
 WiR2020

Greece
Free People

Hungary
 Normális Élet Pártja

Iceland
Responsible Future

Italy
3V Movement

Netherlands
List30

Slovenia
Resni.ca

Turkey
 Party of Life without Imposition

United Kingdom
Humanitarian League (historical)
JABS
Let London Live
National Anti-Vaccination League (historical)
Pioneer Club (historical)

North America

Canada
Vaccine Choice Canada
Free Party Canada

United States
Anti-Vaccination League of America
Anti-Vaccination Society of America
Association of American Physicians and Surgeons
The Autism Community in Action (TACA; formerly Talk About Curing Autism)
Children's Health Defense
Children's Medical Safety Research Institute
Freedom Angels Foundation
Health Freedom Idaho
Informed Consent Action Network
Learn The Risk
National Vaccine Information Center
New Jersey Coalition for Vaccination Choice
Ohio Advocates for Medical Freedom
Palmetto Family Council
Stop Mandatory Vaccination
Texans for Vaccine Choice

Oceania

Australia
Australian Vaccination-risks Network
Church of Conscious Living
Health Australia Party
Homeopathy Plus!
Informed Medical Options Party

New Zealand
Advance New Zealand
New Zealand Outdoors Party
New Zealand Public Party
The Freedoms & Rights Coalition
Voices for Freedom
Warnings About Vaccination Expectations NZ

References 

Vaccine hesitancy

anti-vaccination groups
anti-vaccination groups